Maine v. Taylor, 477 U.S. 131 (1986), was a case in which the Supreme Court of the United States held that there was an exception to the "virtually per se rule of invalidity"  of the dormant commerce clause. The Supreme Court of the United States found that a Maine law prohibiting the importation of out-of-state bait fish was constitutional because Maine authorities couldn't be certain that imported fish would be free of "parasites and nonnative species" that might pose environmental harm to local ecology. Discriminatory laws may be upheld only if they serve "legitimate local purposes that could not adequately be served by available nondiscriminatory alternatives," wrote Justice Blackmun, author of the majority opinion. In City of Philadelphia v. New Jersey, the Court had previously ruled that New Jersey's ban of out-of-state solid waste was facially discriminatory to the state's residents in a national market and was therefore overturned.

See also
 Missouri, Kansas, & Texas Railway Company of Texas v. Clay May: 1904 case on invasive species  
 List of United States Supreme Court cases, volume 477

References

External links

United States Constitution Article One case law
United States Supreme Court cases
United States Supreme Court cases of the Burger Court
United States Dormant Commerce Clause case law
1986 in the environment
1986 in United States case law
Environment of Maine
Fishing in the United States
Agriculture in Maine
Invasive species in the United States
United States environmental case law